Matthew Robert Dench is an Australian professional footballer who plays as a defender or midfielder for League One club Charlton Athletic.

Career

Charlton Athletic
Coming through the youth system of Charlton Athletic, Dench signed his first professional contract with the club on 11 July 2022.

He made his professional debut for Charlton, coming off the bench in the 67th minute of a 3–0 EFL Trophy victory at home against Gillingham on 31 August 2022.

Career statistics

References

External links
 

Living people
English footballers
Australian expatriate sportspeople in England
Charlton Athletic F.C. players
Association football defenders
Association football midfielders
2003 births